The 54th Massachusetts Infantry Regiment was an infantry regiment that saw extensive service in the Union Army during the American Civil War. The unit was the second African-American regiment, following the 1st Kansas Colored Volunteer Infantry Regiment, organized in the northern states during the Civil War.Authorized by the Emancipation Proclamation, the regiment consisted of African-American enlisted men commanded by white officers. 

The unit began recruiting in February 1863 and trained at Camp Meigs on the outskirts of Boston, Massachusetts. Prominent abolitionists were active in recruitment efforts, including Frederick Douglass, whose two sons were among the first to enlist. Massachusetts Governor John Albion Andrew, who had long pressured the U.S. Department of War to begin recruiting African-Americans, placed a high priority on the formation of the 54th Massachusetts. Andrew appointed Robert Gould Shaw, the son of Boston abolitionists, to command the regiment as Colonel. The free black community in Boston was also instrumental in recruiting efforts, utilizing networks reaching beyond Massachusetts and even into the southern states to attract soldiers and fill out the ranks. After its departure from Massachusetts on May 28, 1863, the 54th Massachusetts was shipped to Beaufort, South Carolina and became part of the X Corps commanded by Major General David Hunter.

During its service with the X Corps, the 54th Massachusetts took part in operations against Charleston, South Carolina, including the Battle of Grimball's Landing on July 16, 1863, and the more famous Second Battle of Fort Wagner on July 18, 1863. During the latter engagement, the 54th Massachusetts, with other Union regiments, executed a frontal assault against Fort Wagner and suffered casualties of 20 killed, 125 wounded, and 102 missing (primarily presumed dead)—roughly 40 percent of the unit's numbers at that time. Col. Robert G. Shaw was killed on the parapet of Fort Wagner. In 1864, as part of the Union Army's Department of Florida, the 54th Massachusetts took part in the Battle of Olustee.

The service of the 54th Massachusetts, particularly their charge at Fort Wagner, soon became one of the most famous episodes of the war, interpreted through artwork, poetry and song. More recently, the 54th Massachusetts gained prominence in popular culture through the film Glory.

Organization and early service

General recruitment of African Americans for service in the Union Army was authorized by the Emancipation Proclamation issued by President Lincoln on January 1, 1863. Secretary of War Edwin M. Stanton accordingly instructed the Governor of Massachusetts, John A. Andrew, to begin raising regiments including "persons of African descent" on January 26, 1863. Andrew selected Robert Gould Shaw to be the regiment's colonel and Norwood Penrose "Pen" Hallowell to be its lieutenant colonel. Like many officers of regiments of African-American troops, both Robert Gould Shaw and Hallowell were promoted several grades, both being captains at the time. The rest of the officers were evaluated by Shaw and Hallowell:  these officers included Luis Emilio, and Garth Wilkinson "Wilkie" James, brother of Henry James and William James.  Many of these officers were of abolitionist families and several were chosen by Governor Andrew himself. Lt. Col. Norwood Hallowell was joined by his younger brother Edward Needles Hallowell who commanded the 54th as a full colonel for the rest of the war after Shaw's death. Twenty-four of the 29 officers were veterans, but only six had been previously commissioned.

The soldiers were recruited by black abolitionists like Frederick Douglass and Major Martin Robison Delany, M.D., and white abolitionists, including Shaw's parents. Lieutenant J. Appleton, the first white man commissioned in the regiment, posted a notice in the Boston Journal. Wendell Phillips and Edward L. Pierce spoke at a Joy Street Church recruiting rally, encouraging free blacks to enlist. About 100 people were actively involved in recruitment, including those from Joy Street Church and a group of individuals appointed by Governor Andrew to enlist black men for the 54th. Among those appointed was George E. Stephens, African-American military correspondent to the Weekly Anglo-African who recruited over 200 men in Philadelphia and would go on to serve as a First Sergeant in the 54th.

The 54th trained at Camp Meigs in Readville near Boston. While there they received considerable moral support from abolitionists in Massachusetts, including Ralph Waldo Emerson. Material support included warm clothing items, battle flags and $500 contributed for the equipping and training of a regimental band. As it became evident that many more recruits were coming forward than were needed, the medical exam for the 54th was described as "rigid and thorough" by the Massachusetts Surgeon-General. This resulted in what he described as "a more robust, strong and healthy set of men were never mustered into the service of the United States." Despite this, as was common in the Civil War, a few men died of disease prior to the 54th's departure from Camp Meigs.

By most accounts the 54th left Boston with very high morale. This was despite the fact that Jefferson Davis's proclamation of December 23, 1862, effectively put both African-American enlisted men and white officers under a death sentence if captured on the grounds that they were inciting servile insurrection.

After muster into federal service on May 13, 1863, the 54th left Boston with fanfare on May 28, and arrived to more celebrations in Beaufort, South Carolina. They were greeted by local blacks and by Northern abolitionists, some of whom had deployed from Boston a year earlier as missionaries to the Port Royal Experiment. In Beaufort, they joined with the 2nd South Carolina Volunteers, a unit of South Carolina freedmen led by James Montgomery. After the 2nd Volunteers' successful Raid at Combahee Ferry, Montgomery led both units in a raid on the town of Darien, Georgia. The population had fled, and Montgomery ordered the soldiers to loot and burn the empty town. Shaw objected to this activity and complained over Montgomery's head that burning and looting were not suitable activities for his model regiment.

Battle of Grimball's Landing
The regiment's first engagement took place during the Battle of Grimball's Landing on James Island, just outside of Charleston, South Carolina on July 16, 1863. The Union attack on James Island was intended to draw Confederate troops away from Fort Wagner in anticipation of an upcoming Union assault on the fort. During the Battle of Grimball's Landing, the 54th Massachusetts stopped a Confederate advance, taking 45 casualties in the process.

In an account of the engagement which was later published, First Sergeant Robert John Simmons of the 54th Massachusetts (a British Army veteran from Bermuda) described a "desperate battle" in which about 250 pickets of the regiment were attacked by about 900 Confederates. He estimated that the Confederates in their front were supported by a reserve of 3,000 men. The 54th Massachusetts stopped the Confederate advance then, as he described, "had to fire and retreat toward our own encampment."

After the engagement, their division commander, Brig. Gen. Alfred H. Terry, complimented "steadiness and soldierly conduct" of 54th Massachusetts by courier to Col. Shaw and in his official report of the action. This recognition raised the morale of the regiment.

Battle of Fort Wagner
The regiment gained widespread acclaim on July 18, 1863, when it spearheaded an assault on Fort Wagner, a key position overlooking the water approach to Charleston Harbor. The 54th Massachusetts had only recently returned from James Island, after a difficult withdrawal during which they spent two days without food. They returned to the main Union force late on the afternoon of July 18 and the tired and hungry men were immediately placed in the vanguard of the assault force of 4,000 men. The assault was launched at 7:45 pm along a narrow spit of land. The approach required them to pass beyond some of the Confederate fortifications before turning to make their assault. The men crossed a water-filled ditch and took the outer wall of the fort. Because of the strength of the defending force the position could only be held for an hour before the two Union brigades were withdrawn, at around 9:00 pm.

The 54th Massachusetts numbered 600 men at the time of the assault. Of these, 270 were killed, wounded, or captured during the engagement. Col. Shaw was killed, along with 29 of his men; 24 more later died of wounds, 15 were captured, 52 were missing in action and never accounted for, and 149 were wounded. These casualties represented the highest in the history of the regiment during a single engagement.  Two company commanders were killed during the attack.

Although Union forces were not able to take and hold the fort, the 54th was widely acclaimed for its valor during the battle, and the event helped encourage the further enlistment and mobilization of African-American troops, a key development that President Abraham Lincoln once noted as helping to secure the final victory. Decades later, Sergeant William Harvey Carney was awarded the Medal of Honor for grabbing the U.S. flag as the flag bearer fell, carrying the flag to the enemy ramparts and back, and saying "Boys, the old flag never touched the ground!" which would be turned into a song in his honour in 1900. While other African Americans had since been granted the award by the time it was presented to Carney, Carney's is the earliest action for which the Medal of Honor was awarded to an African American.

Battle of Olustee
Under the command of now-Colonel Edward Hallowell, the 54th fought a rear-guard action covering the Union retreat at the Battle of Olustee. During the retreat, the unit was suddenly ordered to counter-march back to Ten Mile station. The locomotive of a train carrying wounded Union soldiers had broken down and the wounded were in danger of capture. It took forty-two hours to pull the train that distance.

As part of an all-black brigade under Col. Alfred S. Hartwell, they unsuccessfully attacked entrenched Confederate militia at the November 1864 Battle of Honey Hill. In mid-April 1865, they fought at the Battle of Boykin's Mill, a small affair in South Carolina that proved to be one of the last engagements of the war.

Pay controversy
The enlisted men of the 54th were recruited on the promise of pay and allowances equal to their white counterparts. This was supposed to amount to subsistence and $13 a month. Instead, they were informed upon arriving in South Carolina, the Department of the South would pay them only $7 per month ($10 with $3 withheld for clothing, while white soldiers did not pay for clothing at all.) Colonel Shaw and many others immediately began protesting the measure. Joseph Barquet, another member of the regiment, also protested the quality of the food which the soldiers were given, which led to him being court-martialed.  Although the state of Massachusetts offered to make up the difference in pay, on principle, a regiment-wide boycott of the pay tables on paydays became the norm.

After Shaw's death at Fort Wagner, Colonel Edward Needles Hallowell took up the fight to get full pay for the troops. Lt. Col. Hooper took command of the regiment starting June 18, 1864. After nearly a month Colonel Hallowell returned on July 16.

Refusing their reduced pay became a point of honor for the men of the 54th. In fact, at the Battle of Olustee, when ordered forward to protect the retreat of the Union forces, the men moved forward shouting, "Massachusetts and Seven Dollars a Month!"

The Congressional bill, enacted on June 16, 1864, authorized equal and full pay to those enlisted troops who had been free men as of April 19, 1861. Of course not all the troops qualified. Colonel Hallowell, a Quaker, rationalized that because he did not believe in slavery he could, therefore, have all the troops swear that they were free men on April 19, 1861. Before being given their back pay the entire regiment was administered what became known as "the Quaker oath". Colonel Hallowell skillfully crafted the oath to say: "You do solemnly swear that you owed no man unrequited labor on or before the 19th day of April 1861. So help you God".

On September 28, 1864, the U.S. Congress took action to pay the men of the 54th. Most of the men had served 18 months.

Legacy

A monument to Shaw and the 54th Massachusetts regiment, constructed 1884–1898 by Augustus Saint-Gaudens on the Boston Common, is part of the Boston Black Heritage Trail. A plaster of this monument was also displayed in the entryway to the U.S. paintings galleries at the Paris Universal Exposition of 1900.

Of the regiment, Governor John A. Andrew said, "I know not where, in all of human history, to any given thousand men in arms there has been committed a work at once so proud, so precious, so full of hope and glory."

A famous composition by Charles Ives, "Col. Shaw and his Colored Regiment", the opening movement of Three Places in New England, is based both on the monument and the regiment.

Colonel Shaw and his men also feature prominently in Robert Lowell's Civil War centennial poem "For the Union Dead." It was originally titled "Colonel Shaw and the Massachusetts' 54th" and published in Life Studies (1959). In the poem, Lowell uses the Robert Gould Shaw memorial as a symbolic device to comment on broader societal change, including racism and segregation, as well as his more personal struggle to cope with a rapidly changing Boston.

A Union officer had asked the Confederates at Battery Wagner for the return of Shaw's body, but was informed by the Confederate commander, Brigadier General Johnson Hagood, "We buried him with his niggers." Shaw's father wrote in response that he was proud that Robert, a fierce fighter for equality, had been buried in that manner. "We hold that a soldier's most appropriate burial-place is on the field where he has fallen." As a recognition and honor, at the end of the Civil War, the 1st South Carolina Volunteers, and the 33rd Colored Regiment were mustered out at the Battery Wagner site of the mass burial of the 54th Massachusetts.

More recently, the story of the unit was depicted in the 1989 Academy Award-winning film Glory, starring Matthew Broderick as Shaw, Denzel Washington as Private Tripp, Morgan Freeman, Cary Elwes, Jihmi Kennedy and Andre Braugher The film re-established the now-popular image of the combat role African Americans played in the Civil War, and the unit, often represented in historical battle reenactments, now has the nickname the "Glory" regiment.

2008 reactivation
The unit was reactivated on November 21, 2008, to serve as the Massachusetts Army National Guard ceremonial unit to render military honors at funerals and state functions. The new unit is now known as the 54th Massachusetts Volunteer Regiment.

See also 

 55th Massachusetts Infantry Regiment
 Massasoit Guards

Notes

Bibliography

External links
 
 
 Written in Glory, Letters from the Soldiers and Officers of the 54th Massachusetts
 54th Massachusetts at the Battle of Olustee
 Photograph of Sgt. Major Lewis Douglass
 Photograph of Charles Douglass
 
 American Civil War Battles of Fort Wagner

Units and formations of the Union Army from Massachusetts
African-American military units and formations of the American Civil War
Military units and formations disestablished in 1865
Military units and formations established in 1863
1863 establishments in Massachusetts